Mustafa Lutfi el-Manfaluti (1876–1924) was an Egyptian writer, and poet who wrote many famous Arabic books. He was born in the Upper Egyptian city of Manfalut to an Egyptian father, and a Turkish mother.

Early life
He memorized the Quran before the age of twelve. He studied at Al-Azhar University in Cairo. He translated, and novelized plays from French. Moreover, he wrote (and translated) several short stories. He started writing Al-Nazarat in 1907, which is his most famous work, it is a collection of his articles under the title: Al-Nazarat. 

One of his most notable traits is that he couldn't read or speak French. He asked some of his friends to translate the play or the book to Arabic, then he rewrote them.

Books
Some of his books are:
Majdolin
Al-Abarat (The Tears), first published in 1915.
Ash-Sha'er (The Poet)
Fee Sabeel Et-taj (For the Sake of the Crown)
Al-Fadeela (Virtue)
Al-Nazarat (Views)

See also

 List of Egyptian authors

References

External links
 

1876 births
1924 deaths
Egyptian male poets
Egyptian people of Turkish descent
Al-Azhar University alumni